Thomas Jones is a British professional wrestler and promoter better known by his ring name The UK Kid. As well as founding his own promotion Varsity Pro Wrestling, Jones has competed in various other professional wrestling promotions in the United Kingdom including All Star Wrestling, LDN Wrestling, Pro Wrestling Guerrilla, Real Quality Wrestling and Catch Wrestling Council.

Career
Thomas Jones began training at the age of 16 under Kris Kay in Gosport, England.  He later went on to train at the Dory Funk's Funking Conservatory. Following his training he went on to make his professional wrestling debut in August 1999, and later would make his debut in the United States against Kris Krugar in San Antonio, Texas.

Varsity Pro Wrestling
In 2006, Jones began running the Varsity Pro Wrestling (VPW) promotion and School of Excellence, performing throughout England as he trained future British stars Chris Andrews, Rob Holte, Robbie Everest, Sam Andrews and others. He also began the training process for Sheamus. The school runs regular sessions several times per week and features guest trainers such as Bob Holly, Kip James and The Road Dogg several times per year.

In February 2008, Jones, as the UK Kid, worked an angle on a VPW event in Portsmouth with Billy Gunn, interfering after Gunn's match, beating him with a chair and leaving him bleeding. Gunn vowed revenge on the next VPW Portsmouth show, though it came at the hands of another individual. When a change to Gunn's contractual status with TNA made him incapable of attending the VPW show in May, he sent long-time friend Bob Holly to "teach the UK Kid a lesson", something that Holly accomplished in a tables, ladders and chairs match held in front of over 600 rabid fans.

This highly successful event was followed up with a return to the Portsmouth Guildhall in August, an event that began with the UK Kid revealing that he had arranged for a 15-foot steel cage to be provided and challenged Holly to a rematch. Holly declined, saying that he had already beaten the Kid in a TLC match, so felt it would be unfair to prevent others on the roster getting a chance to humble Jones's arrogant alter-ego. Holly backed "The Devon Powerhouse" Chris Andrews for the match and offered him support in a backstage interview before the match. In the main event of the show, the UK Kid and Andrews wrestled in the cage for over 20 minutes with Andrews obtaining a large gash on his forehead as a result of the intense action. The resourceful UK Kid eventually managed to fight off Andrews's onslaught long enough to retrieve a roll of electrical tape he had sneaked into the cage before the match, and used it to secure Andrews to the ring ropes. With Andrews immobilised, the UK Kid brought a chair into the ring and began pounding his opponent. Bob Holly, who had defeated Matt Vaughn earlier in the evening and was watching backstage, returned to ringside, entered the cage and snatched the chair away from the UK Kid. A tense moment followed before Holly, to the shock of the audience, began beating the defenceless Andrews. Andy Boy Simmonz, Jason Dunce, Jake McCluskey and a host of VPW officials all attempted to come to Andrews's rescue but were prevented from entering the cage by both Holly and the UK Kid. Eventually the beat-down subsided and Andrews — now a bloody mess — was helped backstage and to a local medical facility.

In October, on the next VPW Guildhall show, The UK Kid and Holly revealed their "International Alliance", explaining that Chris Andrews needed to be put in his place. Andrews brought backup in the form of Billy Gunn's long time tag team partner, The Road Dogg and they issued challenges to Holly and the UK Kid respectively. Later that night, UK Kid defeated The Road Dogg by pinfall, following interference by Bob Holly.

Come February 2010 and the promotion's return to Portsmouth, the evening started badly and just got worse for the UK Kid. During an interview segment, he and Bob Holly belittled teenage sensation "Mr. Moonsault" Jake McCluskey, who had just picked up first VPW victory. An impromptu match followed where McCluskey took advantage of the UK Kid's overconfidence, wrapping him up in a small package for his second victory of the night. In the main event of the evening, Holly and the Kid teamed up in a losing effort against Chris Andrews and Billy Gunn.

The following evening in Basingstoke saw the UK Kid gain a measure of revenge, pinning Billy Gunn in a singles match but later being on the losing team in a six-man tag match between himself, Bob Holly and Rob Holte facing Gunn, Jake McCluskey and Chris Andrews.

Work for other promotions
In August 2006, The UK Kid teamed with Charlie Rage to lose to The Big Show in a handicap match at Wembley Arena, London for WWE.

On 28 August 2008, at Scottish School of Wrestling's "Tainted Tradition" event, The UK Kid won the SPWO UK Championship after defeating 9 other men in a 10-man Battle royal.

On 17 April 2012 the UK Kid wrestled a dark match for WWE at the London tapings of SmackDown, losing to Antonio Cesaro.

On 18 July 2015 the UK Kid wrestled Abdullah the Butcher in a Hardcore Bloodbath match. Jones lost in a decisive fashion, which involved both wrestlers blading heavily.

Championships and accomplishments
Scottish School of Wrestling
SPWO UK Championship (1 time) 
Varsity Pro Wrestling
Varsity Pro Wrestling Championship (1 time)

References

External links
BritWres.com Profile
Varsity Pro Wrestling Interviews the UK Kid
All Star Wrestling Profile

English male professional wrestlers
Living people
People from Fareham
Year of birth missing (living people)